The 2021 Mexican League season was the 96th season in the history of the Mexican League. The league was contested by 18 teams, evenly divided in North and South zones. The season started on 20 May with the series between Sultanes de Monterrey and Acereros de Monclova and ended on 15 September with the last game of the Serie del Rey, where Toros de Tijuana defeated Leones de Yucatán to win the championship.

Two new teams joined the league for this season: Mariachis de Guadalajara and El Águila de Veracruz.

Standings

Postseason

First round

Zone Series

Championship Series

Serie del Rey

Summary

Game summaries

Game 1

Game 2

Game 3

Game 4

Game 5

Game 6

Game 7

Managerial changes

Offseason

In season

League leaders

Milestones

Pitchers

No-hitters
Dylan Unsworth (VER): On 28 May, Unsworth threw his first no-hitter in the Mexican League by defeating the Diablos Rojos del México 8–0.

Awards

References

Mexican League season
Mexican League season
Mexican League seasons